Acromycter is a genus of eels in the family Congridae.

Species
There are currently five recognized species in this genus:
 Acromycter alcocki (C. H. Gilbert & Cramer, 1897)
 Acromycter atlanticus D. G. Smith, 1989
 Acromycter longipectoralis Karmovskaya, 2004
 Acromycter nezumi (Asano, 1958)
 Acromycter perturbator (A. E. Parr, 1932)

References

Congridae